

The IAR-813 was a Romanian trainer aircraft based on the IAR-811. It differed from the IAR 811 in having a bubble canopy and more powerful engine.

Construction and design
Following the flight of the IAR-811 wooden two-seat training aircraft in 1949, the design team at the Sovromtractor tractor factory at Brașov (formerly the Industria Aeronautică Română aircraft works), led by Radu Manicatide, began work on the IAR-813, a more powerful trainer of similar layout. The IAR-813 was, like the IAR-811, a low-winged, single-engine monoplane with side-by-side seating for the crew of two, but differed in being of mixed wood and metal construction compared with the all wooden IAR-811. It had a welded steel tube fuselage structure and a wooden wing, with the structure covered by plywood and fabric. The aircraft was powered by a single  Walter Minor 4-III air-cooled in-line piston engine. The IAR-813 made its maiden flight on 16 March 1950, and the type was certificated on 1 December that year.

Service
An initial batch of 50 aircraft were built for the Romanian Air Force from 1953, with a further 30 IAR-813s delivered to civil sport flying organisations in 1954–55. The type remained in use with the Air Force until at least 1955. 24 civilian aircraft were transferred to air-ambulance duties in 1961.

Specifications

References

External links
 

1950s Romanian military trainer aircraft
813
Aircraft first flown in 1950